(born May 15, 1990) is a Japanese snowboarder who has 12 World Cup victories. He competed for Japan at the 2010 Winter Olympics in half-pipe. He received the second best score in the qualifying round and automatically qualified for the finals. However, in the finals he placed 9th overall.

See also
 Snowboarding at the 2010 Winter Olympics

References

External links
 
 

Japanese male snowboarders
Olympic snowboarders of Japan
Snowboarders at the 2010 Winter Olympics
Snowboarders at the 2014 Winter Olympics
1990 births
People from Matsuyama, Ehime
Living people
X Games athletes
Universiade medalists in snowboarding
Universiade gold medalists for Japan
Competitors at the 2011 Winter Universiade
21st-century Japanese people